Todd Gleaton (born September 25, 1968) is an American professional golfer who played on the Nike Tour, NGA Hooters Tour and mini-tours.

Gleaton had over 60 junior golf tournament wins. He was a member of the North Carolina State Championship High School team playing with South View High School out of Hope Mills, North Carolina.  He was also the 1985 and 1986 North Carolina Junior champion.

Gleaton attended North Carolina State University on a full golf scholarship from 1987 to 1990 and captured numerous titles.  He was the 1988 North South low qualifier 136, 1989 Wolfpack Invitational champion, 1989 University of Georgia Tournament champion, and the 1989 MVP of the NC State golf team.  His NC State team was ACC champions in 1990.

Gleaton joined the Nationwide Tour in 1997 where he won the Nike St. Louis Golf Classic and the Nike Tri-Cities Open. He has also played on the NGA Hooters Tour and the EGolf Professional Tour.

Professional wins (3)

Nike Tour wins (2)

Other wins (1)
1 win on the NGA Hooters Tour

External links

American male golfers
NC State Wolfpack men's golfers
PGA Tour golfers
Golfers from South Carolina
Sportspeople from Charleston, South Carolina
1968 births
Living people